Peter Martin may refer to:

Entertainment
 Peter Martin (actor) (born 1934), British actor
 Peter Martin (jazz pianist) (born 1970), American jazz pianist
 Peter Martin (photographer), Canadian photographer
 Peter B. Martin, American photographer

Politics
 Peter F. Martin (born 1941), American state representative from Rhode Island
 Peter Francis Martin (1867–1937), contractor and political figure in Nova Scotia, Canada

Sports
 Peter Martin (athlete) (born 1962), Paralympian athlete from New Zealand
 Peter Martin (Australian footballer) (1875–1918), Australian rules footballer
 Peter Martin (Canadian football)
 Peter Martin (English footballer) (born 1950), English footballer with Darlington and Barnsley
 Peter Martin (cricketer) (born 1968), English cricketer

Other
 Peter Martin (STP) (died 1645), Irish preacher
 Peter E. Martin (1882–1944), American auto industry executive
 Peter D. Martin (1919–1988), college professor and bookstore owner
 Peter Martin (professor) (born 1940), American professor of English and author
 Peter Martin (darts player) (born 1975), Slovak darts player
 Peter Martin (economist) (born c. 1980), Australian commentator on economics
 Peter W. Martin, American professor of law
 Peter Martin, pen-name of Christine Chaundler (1887–1972), British children's author

See also 
 Peter Martins (born 1946), Danish ballet dancer and choreographer
 Hans-Peter Martin (born 1957), Austrian journalist and Member of Parliament
 Peter Martyn (disambiguation)